The Constitution of the Republic of Artsakh is the basic law of the Republic of Artsakh. It was approved by the people of Artsakh in a referendum that was held on  20 February 2017. It supersedes the constitution previously ratified by the people in 2006. Over 76.5% of the electorate participated in the 2017 referendum. Of these, over 90% voted for its adoption with just under 10% voting against its adoption. This constitution proclaimed the Nagorno-Karabakh Republic to be a sovereign, democratic state that was based on social justice and the rule of law. The constitution states that the names "Republic of Artsakh" and "Republic of Nagorno-Karabakh" are synonymous. The constitution affirms that all power is vested in its citizens, who exercise it directly through constitutional referendums and indirectly through their elected representatives. Proposed changes to the constitution or to an alteration of the borders of the State must be ratified by the people in a referendum. Stepanakert is defined as the state's capital.

Structure 
The Constitution consists of a preamble and 12 chapters.

We, the people of Artsakh:

– filled with the spirit of freedom;

– realizing the dream of our ancestors and the natural right of people to lead a free and secure life in the Homeland and to create;

– showing a firm will to develop and defend the Republic of Nagorno Karabakh formed on September 2, 1991 on the basis of the right of self-determination and proclaimed independent by a referendum conducted on December 10, 1991;

as a free, sovereign state of citizens with equal rights, where a human being, his life and security, rights and freedoms are of supreme value,

– affirming faithfulness to the principles of the Declaration of Independence of the Republic of the Nagorno Karabakh Republic adopted on January 6, 1992;

– recalling with gratitude the heroic struggle of our ancestors and present generations for the restoration of freedom, bowing to the memory of the perished in a war forced upon us;

– fulfilled with the power of unity of all Armenians of the world;

– reviving the historic traditions of statehood in Artsakh;

– aspiring to establish good-neighborly relations with all peoples, first of all with our neighbors, on the basis of equality, mutual respect and peaceful co-existence;

– staying faithful to the just world order in conformity with universal values of the International law

– recognizing our own responsibility for the fate of our historic Homeland before present and future generations;

– exercising our sovereign right,

– for us, for generations to come and for those that will wish to live in Artsakh, adopt and proclaim this Constitution.

See also 
 Constitution of Armenia
 Politics of Armenia

Notes

References

External links
 Constitution of 2017 
 Constitution of 2006 

Politics of the Republic of Artsakh
Artsakh
2017 in law
2017 documents
Constitution of the Republic of Artsakh